The 2012 Rotherham Metropolitan Borough Council election took place on 3 May 2012 to elect members of Rotherham Metropolitan Borough Council in South Yorkshire, England. This was on the same day as other 2012 United Kingdom local elections. The Labour Party gained five seats, and one was gained by an Independent. The British National Party lost both of the seats it was defending, and the Conservative Party only held one of its five seats, in Sitwell ward.

Ward results

Anston & Woodsetts ward

Boston Castle ward

Brinsworth & Catcliffe ward

Dinnington ward

Hellaby ward

Holderness ward
Hilda Jack stood in this ward as a Labour Party candidate in 2008.

Hoober ward

Keppel ward

Maltby ward

Rawmarsh ward

Rother Vale ward

Rotherham East ward

Rotherham West ward
In 2008, Caven Vines stood in this ward as an Independent candidate.

Silverwood ward

Sitwell ward

Swinton ward

Valley ward

Wales ward

Wath ward

Wickersley ward

Wingfield ward

References

2012 English local elections
2012
2010s in South Yorkshire